Francis William Pawson (6 April 1861 – 4 July 1921) was an English footballer who earned two caps for the national team between 1883 and 1885, scoring one goal. Pawson played club football for Cambridge University. His grandson was the comedian Tim Brooke-Taylor.

References

External links
Profile at England Stats
Profile at the Football Association

1861 births
1921 deaths
English footballers
England international footballers
Cambridge University A.F.C. players
Association football forwards